Red link may refer to:

 Red Link Communications, an ISP in Myanmar
 Red Sex Link, a cross-breed of chicken
 A link to a red node in the red–black tree data structure
 Red Link, one of the four Links from the game The Legend of Zelda: A Link to the Past & Four Swords
 A red link in a wiki, a link to a non-existent page, see MediaWiki#Wikilinks